Naibuka Vuli (born 6 June 1960) is a Fijian former rugby union player and immigration officer. He played as prop.

Career
He was educated at Queen Victoria School, for whose rugby team he played at club level. Vuli also played for Nadi Rugby Union from 1987 to 1989 and 1992 to 1993. He was Captain of the undefeated Lautoka Rugby Union team in 1990 to1991..
His first cap for Fiji was during the in 1990 Toulouse Rugby Tournament in   He was also a prop in the 1991 Rugby World Cup  in France and played the match against France, in Grenoble. He played two matches in the tournament. In 1992, he was the captain of the Flying Fijians. His last international cap was on 17 July 1993, in the match against Tonga, in Nuku'alofa.

After career
After his retirement, Vuli became Senior Immigration Officer. In 2009, he was charged with 12 counts of extortion and a count of abuse of office. Between 2007 and 2009, Vuli was alleged of abusing his authority by housing illegal immigrants in to the Department of Immigration, till his retirement on 15 June 2015.

Personal life
Happily married with children and grandchildren all over the globe. Greatly enjoying Gods blessings and now a citizen of the United States after migrating in November 2015.

Notes

External links
Naibuka Vuli international stats

Fiji international rugby union players
Fijian rugby union players
Rugby union props
1960 births
Living people
I-Taukei Fijian people